Janhatal is a small village in Kahuta tehsil, Rawalpindi District, Punjab province, Pakistan. It is surrounded by hills. Inhabitants of Janhatal speak Pothohari, which is a dialect of Punjabi. The inhabitants are predominantly Muslim. The main caste is Janhal. Janhatal has a small mosque and a shop, as well as a government primary school for girls and boys. The people are well educated. Locals bring their households from Nara using the limited public transportation. Locals are connected to agriculture and a few of them have moved abroad to earn more money.

References

Populated places in Rawalpindi District